646 may refer to:

Year 646
646 (number)
Area code 646
ISO/IEC 646